On Probation can refer to:
 On Probation (1924 film), an American silent film
 On Probation (1935 film), an American drama film
 On Probation (1983 film), a British animated film
 On Probation (2005 film), an Argentine comedy film